The decade of the 1170s in art involved some significant events.

Events

 1171: End of the Fatimid art period in Egypt and North Africa

Works

 1178: Lin Tinggui and Zhou Jichang complete The Five Hundred Luohan
 1178: Benedetto Antelami completes Deposition
 1176: Unkei sculpts Dainichi Nyorai at Enjō-ji in Nara
 1173–1176: Zhang Shengwen completes The Sakyamuni Buddha
 1170: Unknown artist completes Limestone Sculpture of the Old Testament Priest Aaron
 1170: Artist(s) complete the Hunterian Psalter illuminated manuscript

Births
 1178: Wuzhun Shifan – Chinese painter, calligrapher, and prominent Zen Buddhist monk (died 1279)
 1176: Fujiwara Nobuzane – Japanese nise-e painter (died 1265)
 1174: Liu Songnian - Song Dynasty Chinese artist (died 1224)
 1173: Tankei – Japanese sculptor of the Kei school of sculptors (died 1256)

Deaths
 1179: Hildegard of Bingen - German writer, composer, philosopher, Christian mystic, Benedictine abbess, visionary, polymath, poet, and producer of miniature Illuminations (born 1098)

Art
Decades of the 12th century in art